Jalpa is a town located in the Mexican state of Zacatecas, close to the border with Jalisco and Aguascalientes and about a two hours drive south of the capital city, Zacatecas. Jalpa is a colonial-style city, with cobble stone streets, narrow walkways, two main churches: El Señor de Jalpa and La Parroquia de San Antonio, and two plazas. Jalpa was modeled by the French in the 19th century. In the middle of the plaza is a kiosk which remains in good shape today, after hundreds of years. Most houses are painted in bright colors just as in colonial times. The houses are made of adobe and share common walls and most have flat roofs.

The original indigenous natives were the Caxcan, Chichimeca and Huichol people.

History
Jalpa was founded in 1532 by Spanish explorers in search of gold and silver. Jalpa was spelled "Xalpa" by its native Caxcan, Chichimeca, and Huichol people. Conquered by the Spanish, the Indian population intermixed with Spanish and other European peoples to form today's mestizos. In 1540, as part of the Mixtón War, the conquistador Diego Fernández de Proaño was expelled from Jalpa by the Caxcanes who were led by Francisco Tenamaztle and their chief Petacatl. They were ultimately defeated and the first church was built in Jalpa in 1542.

Population 
The population is between ten and twelve thousand with most living within the town and surrounding communities. The population continues to grow since Jalpa is a significant transportation hub between the cities of Guadalajara, Aguascalientes, and Zacatecas. A large percentage of the population is older than 50 years; and there are significantly more females than males in the younger age bracket; the overall female to male ratio is about 60% to 40%.  This disproportion is because more males migrate to the United States, where as females usually stay.

Economy
The Leonera Mine operated in Jalpa and was the first site where the mineral jalpaite, a rare copper-silver-sulfide mineral, was discovered in 1858.

Much of the growth in Jalpa is fed by remittances in US dollars from former residents who have emigrated to the United States. Almost every family has at least one member, usually male, residing in the US. Most family members receive money from those living in the United States. There are no known factories in this town that export goods. Farming activity has also been decreasing due to water table shortage in the region's aquifer. Most of Zacatecas lies within two high sierras, hence its dry climate and poor rain seasons. Many traditional plantations/farms that grow guayaba and sugar cane in the 70s, 80s, and early 90s, have been now replaced with agave fields- since these plants require minimal water for growth. Other current farmed crops are: maize (corn), bean, sugar cane, alfalfa, calabaza (pumpkin), and wild cactus (nopales) which gives a fruit called tuna (prickly pear in English).

References 

Populated places in Zacatecas